Roshan Meka is an Indian actor who works in Telugu films. He is the son of actors Srikanth and Ooha. He made his debut in a lead role with Nirmala Convent (2016) and went on to win SIIMA Award for Best Male Debut – Telugu. He later played the lead in Pelli SandaD (2021).

Early life and career 
Roshan Meka is the son of actors Srikanth and Ooha. Meka was formally trained in acting in Mumbai and moved to US. He worked as an assistant director in Bollywood before foraying into acting.

He first appeared on screen in the film Rudhramadevi (2015). The following year, he made his debut as a lead in Nirmala Convent (2016), alongside Nagarjuna. Reviewing his performance, Pranitha Jonnelagadda from The Times of India called him very promising. "His diction, style and even dances are commendable for a start," Jonnelagadda added. Among other positive reviews, a reviewer from The Hindu wrote, "Roshan [...] looks an assured actor on-screen. His body language oozes confidence with sharp dialogue delivery."

He went onto win SIIMA and Best Male Debut – Telugu that year.

In 2021, Meka appeared in Pelli SandaD, a sequel to the 1996 film Pelli Sandadi which starred his father Srikanth. Thadagath Pathi of The Times of India wrote, "Roshan pulls off the emotions required of him well, it's the perfect launch for him as a hero." A reviewer from The Hans India also appreciated Meka's performance, stating: "He has all the qualities of a good-looking hero. He dances very well and also emoted well in a few scenes. There is a long career for him in the industry."

Filmography
 All films are in Telugu unless otherwise noted.

References

External links

Living people
Indian male film actors
Male actors in Telugu cinema
South Indian International Movie Awards winners
21st-century Indian male actors
Year of birth missing (living people)
Telugu male actors